Tobias Kurbjuweit (born 30 December 1982) is a German former professional footballer who played as a midfielder or forward.

Career 
Kurbjuweit was born in Jena. He made his professional debut in the German 3. Liga against 1. FC Heidenheim on 24 July 2010.

Personal life 
Tobias is the son of former footballer and current director of sport of FC Carl Zeiss Jena Lothar Kurbjuweit.

References

External links 
 

1982 births
Living people
Sportspeople from Jena
People from Bezirk Gera
German footballers
Footballers from Thuringia
Association football midfielders
Association football forwards
2. Bundesliga players
3. Liga players
FC Carl Zeiss Jena players
FC St. Pauli players
1. FSV Mainz 05 II players
1. FC Magdeburg players
1. FC Union Berlin players
Tennis Borussia Berlin players
Berliner FC Dynamo players
Chemnitzer FC players
1. FC Gera 03 players